Pozzomaggiore is a comune (municipality) in the Province of Sassari in the Italian region Sardinia, located about  northwest of Cagliari and about  south of Sassari.

Pozzomaggiore borders the following municipalities: Bosa, Cossoine, Mara, Padria, Semestene, Sindia, and Suni.

Demographic evolution

References

External links

 www.comune.pozzomaggiore.ss.it/

Cities and towns in Sardinia